The Visit Panamá Cup de Chitré is a tennis tournament held in Chitré, Panama since 2014. The event is part of the ATP Challenger Tour and is played on Hard courts.

Past finals

Singles

Doubles

References

External links
Official website